Alfonso Rossetti (died 1577) was a Roman Catholic prelate who served as Bishop of Ferrara (1563–1577)
and Bishop of Comacchio (1559–1563).

Biography
On 22 October 1548, Alfonso Rossetti was appointed during the papacy of Pope Paul III as Coadjutor Bishop of Comacchio.
He succeeded to the bishopric on 21 December 1559.
On 8 October 1563, he was appointed during the papacy of Pope Pius IV as Bishop of Ferrara.
He served as Bishop of Ferrara until his death on 25 February 1577.

References

External links and additional sources
 (for Chronology of Bishops) 
 (for Chronology of Bishops) 
 (for Chronology of Bishops) 
 (for Chronology of Bishops) 

16th-century Italian Roman Catholic bishops
Bishops appointed by Pope Paul III
Bishops appointed by Pope Pius IV
1577 deaths